Robert Chappell (born 1952) is an American cinematographer, writer, and director. His cinematography credits include The Thin Blue Line, The Fog of War, In Our Water, and Standard Operating Procedure.

External links
 

1952 births
Living people
American male screenwriters
American cinematographers
American film directors
Place of birth missing (living people)
Date of birth missing (living people)